Ganguroo is a genus of fossil macropods found at Riversleigh in Australia, material dating from the Middle to Late Miocene Epoch. 
The type species of the genus is Ganguroo bilamina, published in 1997. Two recently described species, Ganguroo bites and Ganguroo robustiter, have also been placed in this genus.

References

Further reading
 

Prehistoric macropods
Miocene mammals of Australia
Riversleigh fauna
Fossil taxa described in 1997
Prehistoric marsupial genera